Eddie "Among Ed" Tongol Panlilio (born December 6, 1953) is a Filipino Roman Catholic priest and Governor of Pampanga. He was suspended from his priestly duties upon announcing his intention to run as governor. He was elected governor in May 2007 in a three-way race against incumbent governor Mark Lapid and provincial board member Lilia Pineda. In February 2010, following a recount of votes due to an election protest, the Comelec ruled that Lilia Pineda had won the 2007 election over Panlilio. 

Panlilio was named "Filipino of the Year" for 2007 by the Philippine Daily Inquirer.

Personal life

Eddie Panlilio was born in Minalin, Pampanga on December 6, 1953. He is the sixth of seven children of Gervacio Cunanan Panlilio and Catalina Tongol. He is afflicted with vitiligo, a rare skin disease.

After finishing elementary school at the Minalin Central Elementary School, Panlilio enrolled the Don Bosco Academy, Pampanga his sophomore year after spending a year at the Don Honorio Ventura College of Arts and Trades (DHVCAT). Panlilio was in and out of several seminaries as he went through a long discernment process, and after finishing his theology at the St. Augustine Major Seminary was ordained priest on December 13, 1981.

Priesthood

For fifteen years, Panlilio was the director of the Social Action Center of Pampanga (SACOP), which worked with communities displaced by lahar following the 1991 eruption of Mount Pinatubo. He established the micro-lending program Talete Panyulung ning Kapampangan Inc. (TPKI), based on the Grameen Bank-approach. Now on its 20th year, TPKI released P2 billion in loans to small entrepreneurs in Central Luzon.

Panlilio was suspended from the priesthood by his superior, San Fernando archbishop Paciano Aniceto, for running for governor of Pampanga in 2007.  This means that he is forbidden by the Catholic Church to practice priesthood or perform any of the sacraments reserved to priests.  The 1983 Code of Canon Law, specifically Canon 285.3, forbids priests from occupying political posts. Bishop Leonardo Medroso, chairman of the Catholic Bishops Conference of the Philippines Episcopal Commission on Canon Law cited a conflict between a role in politics and in the church.

Political career
Panlilio ran for the position of governor of Pampanga province in the 2007 Philippine general election. Panlilio defended his controversial decision to enter politics as a logical continuation of his ministry for the poor, whom he sees as having been exploited and neglected for too long by successive administrations of corrupt and uncaring politicians.

Without any political party, he won over his two competitors, provincial board member Lilia Pineda and re-electionist governor Mark Lapid (both allies of President Gloria Macapagal Arroyo). He defeated Pineda by a slim margin of 1,147 votes out of over 600,000 votes cast.

Governor of Pampanga 
Panlilio was inaugurated as the 26th governor of the province of Pampanga on June 30, 2007. Supreme Court Associate Justice Consuelo Ynares-Santiago administered the oath of office. During the inauguration, the new governor vowed to stop corruption and to make the province an example of a "new dawn in Philippine politics".
 On July 4, 2007, Among Ed began serving his term amid the province's hope to erase its reputation of being the country's Vatican of "jueteng" or illegal gambling. Pampanga has had a long history of patronage politics and corruption.

One of Panlilio's achievements in office was to increase the province's revenue from quarry taxes. It is suspected that under previous governors, notably Mark Lapid and Lito Lapid, the large quarry industry was riddled with corruption and graft. The increased tax base has led to fighting among mayors over the new revenue.

On August 27, 2007, Panlilio campaigned to bring his government closer to the Kapangpangans by leading the caravan "Pamisaupan (Helping One Another)" in Pampanga.  Panlilio and his team delivered bags of cement, toilet bowls, boxes of floor tiles and cans of paint to San Luis Hospital which had only 2 doctors, 8 nurses and 10 midwives to serve 140,000 residents of San Luis, Pampanga, San Simon, Pampanga and Candaba, Pampanga.  Panlilio further vowed to improve the facilities and conditions in the province's 9 district hospitals including the Diosdado Macapagal Provincial Hospital from funds (P143-million development fund) and private groups' contributions.  Panlilio stated, What we are doing is bringing the provincial government's services to the people to make health, education and livelihood assistance accessible to them.  The capitol's P37-million special education fund (SEF) would be utilized for the SEFs of towns.

Panlilio, launched the White Ribbon campaign on October 1, 2007, to engage the people of Pampanga to get involved in the crusade for good governance and good citizenship. Some 70 people gathered and white ribbons marked with words "Good Governance" and  handbills with messages were distributed. Panlilio stated: "I believe that the spirit of the white ribbon is still very much alive. This campaign is really a call and for a response to people to be involved in good governance and good citizenship."

On October 13, 2007, Panlilio admitted that a palace staff personally gave him a brown paper gift bag with 500,000 Philippine pesos (P1,000 bills in 5  bundles, P100,000 each). Panlilio confessed that money changed hands after the meeting "because as a priest and a public officer, I should not lie. I believe that since the money came from Malacanang, I also believe it is public money. So I should be accountable for it and transparent about it." Gloria Macapagal Arroyo called the meeting with 200 officers of the Union of Local Authorities of the Philippines (Ulap), an organization of governors, mayors and other local officials. It was held after Mrs. Arroyo met 190 congressmen, where envelopes of  P200,000 and P500,000 were distributed. Cebu Rep. Antonio Cuenco confirmed he was given P200,000 as a "Christmas gift".

Panlilio on June 23, 2008, filed a 6-page complaint-affidavit for plunder against Lubao businessman Rodolfo "Bong" Pineda before the Ombudsman in Quezon City. He accused Pineda of conspiracy with Joseph Estrada, based on the verdict rendered by the Sandiganbayan.

Pampanga Bishop Pablo Virgilio David, on July 10 led the 69 bishops-signatories (of 80 bishops who attended the July plenary assembly of the Catholic Bishops Conference of the Philippines), to petition the Ombudsman, to "really attend to the merits" of the plunder case. Bishop Broderick Pabillo, director of the CBCP National Secretariat for Social Action, on the request of the Pampanga Anti-Gambling Council (PAGC) appealed to the CBCP. The letter states: "In the whole trial of Estrada, the name of Bong Pineda was mentioned several times. But he was dropped along the way. He has been free and no case was filed against him."

Panlilio on June 26, 2008, in his 20-page counter-affidavit filed with the Office of the Ombudsman, moved for the dismissal of the April 2008 (Vice Governor Joseller Guiao / provincial board / Panlilio supporter  Lolita Hizon) corruption (R.A. 3019) suit against him failure to implement the September 2007 Ordinance 176. DOJ Justice Secretary Raul M. Gonzalez did not act on Panlilio's November 2007 petition to nullify the ordinance, for it was "not a tax ordinance", further ruling that the P 300 was a "regulatory fee". Panlilio's however, who obtained a temporary restraining order from the Pampanga RTC (challenging Gonzalez's ruling), also asked for the suspension of the Ombudsmand perjury case, on the ground of "prejudicial question" raised by the Pampanga civil action.

In Diliman, Quezon City, Candaba Mayor Jerry Pelayo, in tears, joined by 18 Pampanga mayors (except San Fernando and Angeles mayors) waged war against Panlilio by means of prayer. The members of the Pampanga Mayors League (PML) on June 26, 2008, attacked Eddie Panlilio due to his "autocratic style of governance" and alleged poor performance in office. The PML released the statement: "Panlilio is a type of leader who loves to project himself in media as good and working governor when in fact he has not accomplished anything significant for the welfare of the Kapampangan and for the development of the province for almost a year in office except the increase in quarry collection."

Lawyer Elly Velez Lao Pamatong filed a perjury criminal case with the COMELEC Legal Department on June 24, 2008, against Eddie Panlilio for under-declaration of expenditures and contribution receipts: "Contrary to law, Fr. Eddie T. Panlilio, knowingly and maliciously concealed P6,011,329.51 in political contribution and what he declared was only P4,761,699.90."

Though all of these accusations were not proven enough.

Recount petition and dismissal 
On August 21, 2008, a non-profit organization Kapanalig at Kambilan Ning Memalen Pampanga Inc. (Kambilan), led by its president Rosve Henson, a former election campaigner of losing gubernatorial candidate Lilia Pineda, launched a recall campaign against Panlilio, on the ground of loss of confidence in the governor's leadership. In the case of Pampanga, the required petitioners must be at least 98,703 which represent 10% of the total number of registered voters in Pampanga as of April 20, 2007, the 2007 Philippine general election. This is based on the records of Commission on Elections, as required by Section 74, RA 7160, and COMELEC Resolution 7505, in relation to ARTICLE X, Sec. 3 and Section 74 of R.A. 7160, LOCAL GOVERNMENT CODE , as amended by Section 1, RA 9244. Panlilio is the first Pampanga governor which was subject of the recall campaign.

On October 15, 2008, a formal recall petition against Panlilio for loss of confidence was filed with the Commission on Elections. 15,000 "Kambilan" petitioners delivered 168 boxes containing the 224,875 voters' signatures from 20 Pampanga towns and San Fernando City. In a 32-page petition, Panlilio moved to dismiss the recall petition.

In February 2010, COMELEC announced that they had conducted a recount following an election protest.  The Comelec ruled that Lilia Pineda had won in fact won election three years earlier and Pineda replace Panlilio as governor. As a result, they ordered him to step down from this position, but he only stepped down after he lost to Pineda in the 2010 elections. His term ended on June 30, 2010.

Post-governorship
Panlilio ran once again as governor in the 2013 elections, but he lost once again to incumbent governor Lilia Pineda.

References

External links
 amonged.com - Fr. Ed Panlilio website
 sacop.org.ph - Social Action Centre of Pampanga (SACOP)

1953 births
Living people
Governors of Pampanga
21st-century Filipino Roman Catholic priests
Liberal Party (Philippines) politicians
Independent politicians in the Philippines
Kapampangan people
People from Pampanga
People with vitiligo
20th-century Filipino Roman Catholic priests